On the Road (Czech: "Na cestě") is a documentary travelogue series on Czech Television. On The Road is produced by FRMOL production www.frmol.com. Since 2006, Czech Television has broadcast more than 500 episodes of the programme. Movies of the series cover the lifestyle, habits and the typical features of the regions around the world. Each episode takes 26 minutes and is presented by the voices of Czech actors Jiří Bartoška and Miroslav Donutil.

References

External links

Travel television series
2006 Czech television series debuts
Czech Television original programming
Czech documentary television series